I Knew That Woman (Spanish: Yo conocí a esa mujer) is a 1942 Argentine film directed by Carlos F. Borcosque and starring Libertad Lamarque and Agustín Irusta.

Cast
 Libertad Lamarque		
 Agustín Irusta		
 Elsa O'Connor		
 Elvira Quiroga		
 Enrique Chaico		
 Nélida Bilbao		
 Osvaldo Miranda		
 Rafael Frontaura		
 Federico Mansilla		
 José Antonio Paonessa		
 Mecha López		
 Eduardo Sosa Lastra		
 Elianne Arroyo		
 Nélida Plaza

References

External links
 

1942 films
1940s Spanish-language films
Argentine black-and-white films
Films directed by Carlos F. Borcosque
Argentine drama films
1942 drama films
1940s Argentine films